Sudesh Dhankhar is an Indian doctor and the current Second Lady of India. She was previously the First Lady of West Bengal.

Personal life 
She married Jagdeep Dhankhar, Vice President of India in the year 1979. She has one daughter named Kamna.

References 

Living people
21st-century Indian medical doctors
Second ladies and gentlemen of India
Year of birth missing (living people)